Mwanzo is the debut album by Sauti Sol, a Kenyan afro-pop band. It was released on August 4, 2009 by Penya Records.

Singles
 "Lazizi" was released as the album's lead single. The song became popular among the band's fans, with other musicians performing their own cover versions of it. The song is about an ordinary man's plea to get a lady's number, so he can at least plan to take her out on a date, and earned the band thousands of fans across East Africa.
 "Blue Uniform" was released as the album's second single. It depicts police harassment towards the youth in Kenya. The band's singers Bien-Aimé Baraza, Willis Austin Chimano and Delvin Mudigi divide their verses into three personas: an innocent arrested youth, a bad police officer and another who explains why police officers sometimes get into corruption, with the story ending with the policeman releasing the youth with a stern warning.
 "Sunny Days" and "Nairobi" were released as the album's third and fourth singles, respectively. Featuring soul singer Stan, "Nairobi" is a tribute to Nairobi's beauty, sunshine, people, history, arts and culture.

Track listing 
Track listing for Mwanzo adapted from Amazon.com and Sauti Sol's official website.

References

External links
 Penya website

2009 debut albums
Sauti Sol albums
Swahili-language albums
Albums produced by Sauti Sol